The Bangladesh Chhatra League (BSL), formerly known as the East Pakistan Student League, often simply called the Chhatra League, is a students' political organisation in Bangladesh, founded by Sheikh Mujibur Rahman on 4 January 1948. BSL is the student wing of the Bangladesh Awami League.

During the Bangladesh Liberation War, the Bangladesh Chhatra League was a key player, but in 1972, it broke up into two factions based on their allegiance to Shekh Mujibur Rahman. The group was a pioneer in the 1952 Language Movement, the 1954 general election victory of the United Front (East Pakistan), the anti-Aiyub movement in 1958, the education movement in 1962, the Six-Point movement in 1966, the mass uprising in 1968, and the 1970 general elections.

BSL has been repeatedly accused of using torture, extortion, violence, forced prostitution, and killings to instill fear. At least 33 people were killed and 1,500 got seriously injured from attacks by BSL between 2009 and 2014. Number of fatalities rose to 129 between 2014 and 2018 while 31 people were killed in 2018 alone. 

A BSL leader was arrested for links with the banned terrorist group Jamaat-ul-Mujahideen Bangladesh in a militant hunt after the July 2016 Dhaka attack. The leaders and activists of the organization was found involved in the 2021 Bangladesh communal violence.

Bangladesh Chhatra League is accused of running a 'forced prostitution' racket by forcing the girls of Eden Mohila College unit by blackmailing them.  

Following the attacks on student protesters in 2018, a petition was started by general people of Bangladesh to "Enlist Bangladesh Chhatra League (BSL) as a Terrorist Organization" at Change.org. In 2019, prominent English-language daily of Bangladesh, Dhaka Tribune labelled the organization as "the brand of shame". On May 26, 2022 after a series of attack on dissident student groups eight left-wing student organizations termed Bangladesh Chhatra League a 'terrorist organization'.

History 
On 4 January 1948, the East Pakistan Muslim Chhatra League was established by Sheikh Mujibur Rahman at a meeting in Fazlul Huq Muslim Hall at the University of Dhaka. The organisation's name was later changed to the Bangladesh Chhatra League. Naeemuddin Ahmed was the first convener of BSL, while Khaleque Nawaz Khan was the founder general secretary of the Chhatra League.

During the 1971 Bangladesh Liberation War, members of the Chhatra League were recruited into the Mujib Bahini (also known as the Bengal Liberation Force), an armed group trained by India's foreign intelligence agency, the Research and Analysis Wing. However, their exact involvement in the war is disputed, with Zafrullah Chowdhury stating, "The Mujib Bahini did not fight the liberation war." In 2014, A. K. Khandker was sued for accusing the Mujib Bahini of hooliganism and looting during the war in his book in his book 1971: Bhetore Baire.

Violence

Rape and sexual harassment against women 
Since 1990s numerous rape and sexual violence allegations have surfaced in the media involving Chhatra League leaders and activists. Chhatra League leaders and activists often use rape as a tool to suppress the women and create an environment of fear. There are well documented incidents that Chhatra League leaders have even celebrated their century of raping women.

Culture of rape in Jahangirnagar University 

The general secretary of Bangladesh Chhatra League Jahangirnagar University unit, Jasimuddin Manik and his followers celebrated the rape of 100th girls including at least 20 students of the university in 1998. This led to a series of protests which resulted in the expulsion of Manik and his followers from the university on 2 August 1999 after the 1999 JU Anti-Rape Movement.

Women harassment on Pohela Boishakh 2015 
On Bangla New Year celebration of Dhaka University campus, a group of students sexually assaulted women on the venue and tried to strip them off their clothing. Law enforcement was present in the vicinity, yet the miscreants were not stopped, according to witness accounts:"When we sought help from a few policemen standing 20 yards from the spot, they said that the area was beyond their jurisdiction,” said Amit who also came under attack by the youths and had his fingers fractured.

Amit along with five of his fellow activists had tried to save a group of women aged between 25-30 years from the rowdy youths.

"The youths were divided into three groups and each group had 10-12 of them. People everywhere around were blowing vuvuzela so loudly that nobody could hear the victims' cry for help," he said, adding thousands of people were milling around the area, making it difficult for them to prevent the attackers.Despite having CCTV footage which clearly identified the culprits, the police made no arrests by 2019:The probe over the incident was forced to end as the DB police failed to concretely identify any of the culprits beyond simple facial and visual CCTV recording during their eight-month-long investigation. DB Sub inspector Dipok Kumar Das submitted a final report to court on 13 December 2015, saying he had failed to identify any of the suspects.As the ruling party Awami League has control over law enforcement and Chhatra League is the student wing of Awami League, it is widely speculated that the police assisted Chhatra League to carry out these attacks by taking no action to stop them and by making no arrests. Notably, Chhatra League also prevented its female members from protesting this incident.

Gang Rape of a schoolgirl in Narayanganj 
On 08 January 2020, a schoolgirl was reportedly abducted from Gandharbpur Bus Stand area in Narayanganj by a group led by Abu Sufian Sohan, vice president of Tarabo Municipality Chhatra League. After a couple of days of gang rape, they left the schoolgirl at Sanarpar area in Siddhirganj and ran away. The same group was also accused of raping two garment workers. On 12 January, Police arrested Sohan with drugs from Ashuganj area. Afterwards, he was expelled from Chhatra League.

MC College rape allegations 

On 28 September 2020, The Daily Star, reported that BCL had participated in factional clashes at MC College, which resulted in 4 people dying in various incidents since 2018. The report came after BCL activists allegedly raped a woman in front of "BCL Men's Room" at MC College. The victim's husband has filed a rape against several BCL activists and the victim has named several in her court statement. A total of 7 suspects have been arrested as of 29 September 2020. DNA reports have confirmed involvement of the suspects.

Rape of tourist in Cox's Bazar 
A woman tourist, housewife and mother of an eight-month-old child, was gang-raped by Joy, Ashiq, and Babu in December 2021. The trio was reported to be close aide to Cox's Bazar Zila Chhatra League President SM Saddam Hossain. The woman tourist was first separated from her husband and children, who were held as hostages by the three alleged rapists while the woman tourist was raped in the tourism capital of Bangladesh. Prominent women rights activist Shireen Huq opined that the incident is "misogyny and banditry at its worst."

Rape of a young woman in Gopalganj 
Govt. Muksudpur College Chhatra League General Secretary Naim Kazi was arrested on charges of abducting and raping a young woman in February 2022. The rape victim was his own sister-in-law and the case was filed by his own father-in-law.  According to the case statement, Naim forcefully abducted his sister-in-law on 21 January 2022 and raped her in an unknown place.

Rape attempt in Chattogram University 
A female student of the Chattagram University was stripped naked after some Chhatra League goons picked her up right in front of her dormitory inside the university and attempted to rape her. Later, an investigation by law enforcement agencies found that the five accused are activists of the Deputy Education Minister Mohibul Hasan Chowdhury's close aide Rezaul Haque. Rezaul Haque obstructed the girl from filing complaint for which he was served a show-cause notice from Chhatra League. But before this incident, two more students were sexually assaulted by the followers of Deputy Education Minister Mohibul Hasan Chowdhury inside the campus and the Chattagram University parked the cases as they involved Chhatra League and the minister.

Sexual exploitation at Eden College 
Allegations against the Chhatra League leadership of sexually exploiting female students surfaced on the media, made by their colleagues at the Eden Mohila College, in September 2022. A section of Chhatra League leaders in Eden College claimed that the President of the unit, blessed by the senior leadership of the organization, blackmail young students with their compromising photographs and videos to 'sexually submit to male party leaders and high-ups'.

Rape of a housewife in Bogura 
On 09 August 2022, a case was filed against Sonatala Upazila Chhatra League General Secretary Sujan Kumar Ghosh by a housewife over rape allegations. She also said that Sujan threatened him to not to share the incident with anyone. The case led to his expulsion from Chhatra League.

Rape of a speech-impaired teen in Lakshmipur 
On 06 December 2022, vice president of Kamalnagar Upazila Chhatra League Mahbub Alam Shiplu was arrested over allegations of raping a speech-impaired teen. According to the case statement, the 17-year-old rape survivor's aunt caught Shiplu red-handed while doing the heinous crime.

Murder

Killing of Nahid Hossain 
A mob allegedly led by Dhaka College Chhatra League killed Nahid Hossain, a poor deliveryman, during a clash with local shopkeepers of New Market, Dhaka. Nahid Hossain, who was in his twenties, started from him home of Kamrangirchar to his workplace at Elephant Road on April 20. But a few yards away from his workplace, he was surrounded by a mob allegedly led by the activists of Chhatra League from the Dhaka College, who beat him down and lynched him with sharp machettes mercilessly only to leave him die on the street.

Murder of Abrar Fahad 

A student of Bangladesh University of Engineering and Technology was beaten to death after Bangladesh Chhatra League men allegedly questioned him suspecting his involvement with Shibir.

Alleged students are: Mehedi Hasan Rasel of civil engineering, general secretary of Buet BSL, Muhtasim Fuad of civil engineering vice-president, Mehedi Hasan Robein of chemical engineering, the organizing secretary, Anik Sarker of mechanical engineering, the secretary of information and research affairs, Ishtiaq Ahmed Munna of mechanical engineering, the publication affairs secretary, Ifti Mosharraf Shakal of biomedical engineering batch-16, the deputy social welfare secretary, Meftahul Islam Zion of naval architecture and marine engineering, the sports secretary, Muzahidur Rahman Muzahid of civil engineering, Muntasir Alam Jemi of chemical engineering and Khandaker Tabakhkharul Islam Tanvir of mechanical engineering, Moniruzzaman Monir, Water Resources Engineering Department, Akash Hossain, Civil Engineering Department and Shamsul Arefin Rafat, Mechanical Engineering Department of Buet.

Murder of Biswajit Das 

Biswajit Das, a 24-year-old tailor in Dhaka, Bangladesh, was murdered on 9 December 2012 by members of the Bangladesh Chhatra League who mistook Das for an opposition supporter. Das was chased and attacked with machetes, iron bars, and hockey sticks. He was taken to Mitford Hospital, where he shortly died of his wounds. Twenty-one BSL activists were found guilty of murder on 18 December 2013. Eight were sentenced to death and thirteen were sentenced to life in prison. Only eight of the twenty-one defendants were in custody at the time of the sentence, with the remaining thirteen tried in absentia.

Hooliganism

2018 conflicts 
In March 2018, a student of Shahjalal University of Science and Technology (SUST) suffered a bullet wound during a clash between two BSL factions. Reportedly, two factions of the SUST unit of BSL, led by vice-presidents of the unit, had battled over establishing supremacy on the campus. A group of BSL men, led by Akando and colleagues, attacked another man in a restaurant near the university. The man responded with a gunshot which injured another student.

In July 2018, protests and counter-violence erupted at various universities, particularly Rajshahi University, over the quota reform movement, which sought to change the quota system that allocated 56% of Bangladesh government jobs to specific classes. In a protest procession on 2 July 2018, quota-reform movement leader Toriqul Islam and 15 others were attacked with sticks, bamboo poles, a dagger and a hammer. Islam's leg was broken as a result of the attack. A correspondent from The Daily Star filmed the incident and the newspaper reported that it had identified eleven of the attackers, stating that ten were members of the BSL. Video and photos of the attack circulated on social media, prompting criticism over police and university administration inaction.

Dhaka road safety protest attacks 

On 29 July 2018, two students were killed and a further twelve people were injured when a bus hit a bus stop in Dhaka. Protests began shortly afterward, demanding better road safety. During the protests, BSL members were alleged to have been involved in numerous attacks on protestors throughout Bangladesh. On 5 August 2018, a number of photojournalists were attacked, allegedly by members of the BSL wearing helmets. Law enforcement officers were present but did not make any attempt to stop the attack.

Attack on journalists 

Reporters Without Borders in its 2020 country report mentioned that during the 2020 Dhaka City Corporation Election, Chhatra League goons attacked and beaten at least 10 journalists brutally as they tried to cover the massive rigging during the election.

Attacks on Anti-Modi Protesters 

Leader of Dhaka University's Chhatra League unit Sanjit Chandra Das declared to "peel off the skin" of the protesters if they protest against Indian Prime Minister Narendra Modi's visit in March 2021 to Bangladesh. His supporters attacked progressive students, Muslims inside the national mosque compound in Dhaka, and students inside a madrasa compound in Brahmanbaria to quell their protests against Modi triggering a violent anti-Modi protest across the country that claimed 10 lives as of 27 March.

Communal Violence

Role in 2021 attack on Hindus 

Leaders and activists of the Chhatra League were found involved in the coordinated attacks on the Hindu community of Bangladesh in at least two districts during the 2021 Bangladesh communal violence, Chandpur and Rangpur. 

In Rangpur, Saikat Mandal, the vice-president of the philosophy department Chhatra League at Rangpur's Carmichael College, who had a personal conflict with a local Hindu youth Paritosh Sarkar, collaborated with the imam of a local mosque to instigate the local Muslim population to conduct the attack on Hindu villages of the area.

In Chandpur, two Chhatra League activists initiated a protest on the alleged "demeaning of Quran" that lead to the attack on local temples and pandals.

Theft

Bicycle theft 
On 24 November 2022, The authorities of Bangabandhu Sheikh Mujibur Rahman Hall at University of Rajshahi expelled Abdullah Al Maruf for stealing a bicycle of a resident student of the dormitory. Maruf was vice-president of Bangbandhu Sheikh Mujibur Rahman hall Chhatra League.

Cattle theft 
In November 2022, a female Chhatra League leader named Babli Akhter was arrested and sent to jail over cattle theft allegations. She was serving as female student affairs secretary of Dhaka District North unit of Chhatra League before being expelled from the organization.

Goat theft 
In 2019, Mohammadpur Thana Chhatra League president with 9 other leaders of the organization was sued for attempting to snatch 212 goats at Dhaka.

In February 2021, vice-president of Madaripur District Chhatra League Tuhin Dorjee was caught red handed by police while stealing a goat from Madaripur-Shibchar regional road.

On 11 November 2022, a Chhatra League leader named Munna Sarder allegedly stole a goat from Ishwarlaxmipur village at Naogaon District. He was arrested on his way to market for selling the goat.

Structure 
Principles: Education, Peace, Progress

Ideology: Bengali Nationalism

Number of units: 111

Main Unit: University of Dhaka Unit

Current Organizational Guardian: Sheikh Hasina

Former presidents and general secretaries

See also 
 List of student organizations in Bangladesh

References

External links
 Website:  https://bsl.org.bd/
 Community website: https://bsl.community/
 Bangladesh Chhatra League on Facebook

Student organisations in Bangladesh
Student wings of political parties in Bangladesh
Bangladesh Awami League
Bangladeshi student movements
Student organizations established in 1948